Giovanni Casini (1689–1748) was known as il Varlunga (based on his native town in Tuscany). He was a portrait painter and sculptor.

References

1689 births
18th-century Italian painters
Italian male painters
Painters from Tuscany
18th-century Italian sculptors
Italian male sculptors
Italian Baroque painters
1748 deaths
18th-century Italian male artists